The city of Belfast is the provincial capital of Northern Ireland. The population of Belfast was 345,418 in 2021.

Population

Population 
The total population of Belfast was 345,418 in 2021, an increase of 3.5%.

Sex 
In 2021, 51% of the population was female while 49% was male.

Age 

The age demographics of Belfast is different to the rest of the constituent country, 18% were aged 0 to 14, 37% aged 15 to 39, 30% aged 40 to 64 and 15% aged 65 and above.

Ethnicity 

Belfast has become in recent decades an ethnically diverse city, although this ethnic diversity is not to the same scale as other cities across the United Kingdom. Previously, the city was exclusively white (categorised as a simplified ethnic group within Northern Ireland) at 98% white in 2001, however by 2021, this had dropped down to 93%.

Migration

Country of birth 
84% of Belfast was born within Northern Ireland, 4% within England, less than 1% for Scotland and Wale, 2% within the Republic of Ireland and 10% from other countries.

Passports held 
43% of Belfast has a UK passport only, 29% has a Republic of Ireland passport only, 6% has both UK and RoI (Republic of Ireland) passports, 8% have other passports and 14% have no passport.

Religion 
Similarly to the trend across all of Northern Ireland, the Protestant population within the city has been in decline, while the non-religious, other religious and Catholic population has risen. In 2021, the proportion of residents who identified as Catholic was 43%, 12% Presbyterian, 8% for the Church of Ireland, 3% Methodist, 6% of Christian religions, 3% other religions and 24% no religion or not stated.

Identity 

In 2021 the largest identity group was 'Irish only' with 35% of the population. After this was; British only 27%, Northern Irish only 17%, British and Northern Irish only 7%, Irish and Northern Irish only 2%, British, Irish and Northern Irish only 2%, British and Irish less than 1% and Other identities with 10%.

References 

Demographics of Northern Ireland
Demographics by city in the United Kingdom